Leuconycta lepidula, the marbled-green leuconycta moth, marbled-green jaspidia or dark leuconycta, is a moth of the family Noctuidae. The species was first described by Augustus Radcliffe Grote in 1874. It is found in North America from Nova Scotia to North Carolina, west to Texas and north to Alberta.

The wingspan is about 30 mm. The forewings are mottled grayish brown and black, generally with large green spots and patches on the distal half. There is a large black patch near the base of the costa and an inverted black triangle midway along the costa. The hindwings are dark gray. Adults are on wing from May to August in one generation per year.

The larvae feed on Taraxacum species, including Taraxacum officinale (common dandelion).

References

Moths described in 1874
Acontiinae
Moths of North America